Langenargen station is a railway station in the municipality of Langenargen, located in the Bodenseekreis district in Baden-Württemberg, Germany.

References

Railway stations in Baden-Württemberg
Buildings and structures in Bodenseekreis